Archie: To Riverdale and Back Again is a 1990 American live-action made-for-television comedy film based on comic book characters published by Archie Comics. It was produced by DiC Entertainment and premiered on NBC Sunday Night at the Movies on May 6, 1990. It was shown in Britain as Weekend Reunion.

Plot
Archie Andrews, fifteen years after graduating from Riverdale High, has become a successful lawyer and is preparing to marry his fiancée, Pam, and move to "the big city". Before doing that, however, he returns home to Riverdale for his high school reunion and save his friend Pop Tate's diner.

Archie and company are all now in their early thirties, with the trials and tribulations one might expect to have happened to such a group over the years:

 Betty, a grade school teacher, has had problems finding permanent employment, and is constantly bossed around by a crummy boyfriend named Robert.
 Veronica, having lived in France since graduation, has been married (and divorced) four times to very wealthy men.
 Jughead, now a successful psychiatrist, is also divorced (although only once), and now has sole custody of a son named Jordan. Due to the divorce and other failed relationships, Jughead carries emotional baggage that manifests itself in a terrible fear of women. A running gag in the movie is Jughead's desperation to avoid seeing Big Ethel during his visit to Riverdale. This is played for laughs at the end when at the reunion it turns out that Big Ethel is no longer the gangly, awkward teenager she once was but is now a striking beauty and still has a crush on Jughead.
 Moose and Midge have gotten married and become chiropractors. They also have a son, Max, who hits it off with Jordan.
 Reggie is a successful gym owner and owns a car lot.

When Archie sees Betty and Veronica for the first time in fifteen years, all his old feelings for them come flooding back, threatening his engagement—and it doesn't help that the girls renew their pursuit of Archie, heedless of the fact that he has a fiancée. Meanwhile, Archie also tries to keep Reggie, helped along by an uncharacteristically menacing Mr. Lodge, from evicting Pop Tate from his soda shop, under the pretext of expanding his gym. Hiram Lodge doesn't want Archie near Veronica and still thinks they are wrong for each other. Archie ultimately saves the Chock'lit Shoppe, though he loses Pam in the bargain, and decides to stay in Riverdale. Veronica, Betty, and Jughead decide to move back to Riverdale as well. Reggie sees the error of his ways and reconciles with his friends.

Cast
Almost all of the characters in the movie are regular or recurring characters in the originating comics:

Additional characters were mostly created for the movie to indicate the passage of time, such as the regulars' children or new romantic partners:

Reception
The NBC movie, broadcast during the May sweeps period, was seen as a pilot for a possible series. It received mixed reviews, though was well received by some critics, who especially praised the casting and performances from the actors. The movie finished a disappointing 51st in the Nielsen ratings.

Comic book version
Archie Comics published a one-shot comic book adaptation of the TV movie which coincided with its premiere. Stan Goldberg and Mike Esposito drew the sections of the book featuring the characters in flashback as teens, while Gene Colan drew the characters as adults, in a realistic style and more "serious" look akin to Rex Morgan, M.D., and John Byrne drew the cover. The comic also shows a flashback to the incident where Archie and Betty were alone in a motel room together (from Betty and Me #40, February 1972). Back Issue! described the one-shot as "an offbeat, impressive package".

Home media
The film was released on VHS in 1997 from New Horizons Home Video, with the movie re-titled as Archie: Return to Riverdale. In Australia, it was released on VHS as Archie's Weekend Reunion.

References

External links 
 
 

1990 films
1990 television films
American children's comedy films
Class reunions in popular culture
Films scored by Mark Snow
Films about infidelity
Films about lawyers
Films adapted into comics
Films based on Archie Comics
Films set in the United States
Live-action films based on comics
NBC network original films
Television films as pilots
Television pilots not picked up as a series
Television series by DIC Entertainment
Films directed by Dick Lowry
1990s English-language films
1990s American films